Göyəçöl (also, Gəyəçöl, Gegechël’, Gegechol’, and Giga-Chel) is a village and municipality in the Masally Rayon of Azerbaijan.  It has a population of 3,213.

References 

Populated places in Masally District